Llesquehue is together with Contaco River the two main rivers of San Juan de la Costa commune in southern Chile. It runs from east to west and discharges into the Pacific Ocean at the hamlet and beach of Pucatrihue.

See also
List of rivers of Chile

Llesquehue River
Rivers of Los Lagos Region